Ctenopoma is a genus of climbing gouramies native to Africa. Microctenopoma has been included in Ctenopoma in the past; in contrast to that genus, Ctenopoma species are egg scatterers with no parental care.

Species
The 18 currently recognized species in this genus are:
 Ctenopoma acutirostre Pellegrin, 1899 (leopard bush fish or spotted ctenopoma)
 Ctenopoma argentoventer (C. G. E. Ahl, 1922) (silverbelly ctenopoma)
 Ctenopoma ashbysmithi Banister & R. G. Bailey, 1979
 Ctenopoma gabonense Günther, 1896
 Ctenopoma garuanum (C. G. E. Ahl, 1927)
 Ctenopoma houyi (C. G. E. Ahl, 1927)
 Ctenopoma kingsleyae Günther, 1896 (tailspot ctenopoma)	
 Ctenopoma maculatum Thominot, 1886
 Ctenopoma multispine W. K. H. Peters, 1844 (many-spined ctenopoma)
 Ctenopoma muriei (Boulenger, 1906) (ocellated labyrinth fish)
 Ctenopoma nebulosum S. M. Norris & Teugels, 1990
 Ctenopoma nigropannosum Reichenow, 1875 (twospot climbing perch)
 Ctenopoma ocellatum Pellegrin, 1899 (eyespot ctenopoma)
 Ctenopoma pellegrini (Boulenger, 1902)
 Ctenopoma petherici Günther, 1864
 Ctenopoma riggenbachi (C. G. E. Ahl, 1927)
 Ctenopoma togoensis (C. G. E. Ahl, 1928)
 Ctenopoma weeksii Boulenger, 1896 (mottled ctenopoma)

References 

 
Anabantidae

Freshwater fish genera
Taxa named by Wilhelm Peters